Leszek is a Slavic Polish male given name, originally Lestko, Leszko or Lestek, related to Lech, Lechosław and Czech Lstimir.

Individuals named Leszek celebrate their name day on June 3.

Notable people
 Lestko
 Leszek I (disambiguation)
 Leszek II (disambiguation)
 Leszek III
 Leszek, Duke of Masovia (ca 1162–1186)
 Leszek I the White (1186/1187-1227)
 Leszek II the Black (1241–1288)
 Leszek Balcerowicz, a Polish economist, the former chairman of the National Bank of Poland and Deputy Prime Minister
 Leszek Bebło (born 1966), Polish long-distance runner, 1993 Paris Marathon champion
 Leszek Blanik, 2008 Olympic gold medalist in vault (gymnastics)
 Leszek Kołakowski (1927–2009), Polish philosopher
 Leszek Miller, former Prime Minister of Poland
 Sir Leszek Krysztof Borysiewicz, British academic and university administrator
 Leszek A Gasieniec, Professor of Computer Science at the University of Liverpool

See also 
 Lech (disambiguation)
 Polish name
 Slavic names

Polish masculine given names
Masculine given names
Slavic masculine given names